Transport in Iraq consists of railways, highways, waterways, pipelines, ports and harbors, marines and airports.

Railways 

total:
2,272 km
standard gauge:
2,272 km 

For more than two decades there have been plans for building a metro system in Baghdad. It is possible that part of the tunnels have been built, but that they are now used for military, shelter, hiding, and escaping purposes. U.N. inspectors have heard of the tunnels for years, but have not found their entrances.  map    In November, 2008, an overground service dubbed the Baghdad Metro began service. Local government in Baghdad is arranging feasibility studies for the construction of two new underground lines

A 37 km monorail is planned in Najaf, which would link three Shi'ite holy sites.

The first Iraqi Republic Railways train to Basra since the overthrow of Saddam Hussein's regime arrived on 26 April 2003.  British troops hope to use the 68 km long railway to transport much-needed aid supplies from the port town of Umm Qasr to Basra.

In June 2011, it was announced that planning had begun for a new high-speed rail line between Baghdad and Basra, with a memorandum of understanding with Alstom having been signed.

Maps
 UNHCR Atlas Map
 UN Map

Railway links with adjacent countries
All adjacent countries generally use , but may vary in couplings. Neighbours with electrified railways – Turkey and Iran – both use the world standard 25 kVAC

  Turkey – via Syria
  Iran – one link partially under construction and a second link planned
 Iraq-Iran Basra-Shalamcheh line – almost complete (2006)
 Kermanshah, Iran, and the Iraqi province of Diyala – construction commenced. 
  Kuwait – no railways
  Saudi Arabia -
  Jordan – partially constructed – break of gauge / gauge
  Syria – same gauge – at Rabiaa/al-Ya'rubiya

Road Transport 
An overland trans-desert bus service between Beirut, Haifa, Damascus and Baghdad was established by the Nairn Transport Company of Damascus in 1923.

Roads

total:
44,900 km 
paved:
37,851 km,
unpaved:
7,049 km (2002)

Waterways
5,729 km (Euphrates River (2,815 km), Tigris River 1,899 km, Third River (565 km)); Shatt al Arab is usually navigable by maritime traffic for about 130 km. The channel has been dredged to 3 m and is in use. The Tigris and Euphrates Rivers have navigable sections for shallow-draft watercraft; the Shatt al Basrah canal was navigable by shallow-draft craft before closing in 1991 because of the Gulf War.

Pipelines
crude oil 5,432 km; natural gas 2,455 km; refined products 1,637 km; liquid petroleum gas 913 km

Ports and harbors

Persian Gulf 
 Umm Qasr Port
 Khawr az Zubayr
 Al Basrah has limited functionality
 Al-Faw

Merchant marine
total:
ships by type:
cargo ship 14, passenger ship 1, passenger/cargo 1, petroleum tanker 13, refrigerated cargo 1, roll-on/roll-off ship 2 (1999 est.)

Airports

Iraq has about 104 airports as of 2012. Major airports include:
Baghdad International Airport
Basra International Airport
Mosul International Airport
Erbil International Airport
Sulaimaniyah International Airport
Najaf International Airport

Airports – with paved runways

Airports – with unpaved runways

Heliports
20 (2012)

See also
 Iraq
 Iraqi Republic Railways

References

External links